A Humanist Manifesto, also known as Humanist Manifesto I to distinguish it from later Humanist Manifestos in the series, was written in 1933 primarily by Raymond Bragg and published with 34 signers. Unlike the later manifestos, this first talks of a new religion and refers to humanism as "the religion of the future." Nevertheless, it is careful not to express a creed or dogma. The document outlines fifteen affirmations on cosmology, biological and cultural evolution, human nature, epistemology, ethics, religion, self-fulfillment, and the quest for freedom and social justice. This latter, stated in article fourteen, proved to be the most controversial, even among humanists, in its opposition to "acquisitive and profit-motivated society" and its demand for an egalitarian world community based on voluntary mutual cooperation. The document's release was reported by the mainstream media on May 1, simultaneous with its publication in the May/June 1933 issue of the New Humanist. 

Two manifestos followed: Humanist Manifesto II in 1973 and Humanism and Its Aspirations in 2003.

Text of the Humanist manifesto I 

The time has come for widespread recognition of the radical changes in religious beliefs throughout the modern world. The time is past for mere revision of traditional attitudes. Science and economic change have disrupted the old beliefs. Religions the world over are under the necessity of coming to terms with new conditions created by a vastly increased knowledge and experience. In every field of human activity, the vital movement is now in the direction of a candid and explicit humanism. In order that religious humanism may be better understood we, the undersigned, desire to make certain affirmations which we believe the facts of our contemporary life demonstrate.

There is great danger of a final, and we believe fatal, identification of the word religion with doctrines and methods which have lost their significance and which are powerless to solve the problem of human living in the Twentieth Century. Religions have always been means for realizing the highest values of life. Their end has been accomplished through the interpretation of the total environing situation (theology or world view), the sense of values resulting therefrom (goal or ideal), and the technique (cult), established for realizing the satisfactory life. A change in any of these factors results in alteration of the outward forms of religion. This fact explains the changefulness of religions through the centuries. But through all changes religion itself remains constant in its quest for abiding values, an inseparable feature of human life.

Today man's larger understanding of the universe, his scientific achievements, and deeper appreciation of brotherhood, have created a situation which requires a new statement of the means and purposes of religion. Such a vital, fearless, and frank religion capable of furnishing adequate social goals and personal satisfactions may appear to many people as a complete break with the past. While this age does owe a vast debt to the traditional religions, it is none the less obvious that any religion that can hope to be a synthesizing and dynamic force for today must be shaped for the needs of this age. To establish such a religion is a major necessity of the present. It is a responsibility which rests upon this generation. We therefore affirm the following:

FIRST: Religious humanists regard the universe as self-existing and not created.

SECOND: Humanism believes that man is a part of nature and that he has emerged as a result of a continuous process.

THIRD: Holding an organic view of life, humanists find that the traditional dualism of mind and body must be rejected.

FOURTH: Humanism recognizes that man's religious culture and civilization, as clearly depicted by anthropology and history, are the product of a gradual development due to his interaction with his natural environment and with his social heritage. The individual born into a particular culture is largely molded by that culture.

FIFTH: Humanism asserts that the nature of the universe depicted by modern science makes unacceptable any supernatural or cosmic guarantees of human values. Obviously humanism does not deny the possibility of realities as yet undiscovered, but it does insist that the way to determine the existence and value of any and all realities is by means of intelligent inquiry and by the assessment of their relations to human needs. Religion must formulate its hopes and plans in the light of the scientific spirit and method.

SIXTH: We are convinced that the time has passed for theism, deism, modernism, and the several varieties of "new thought".

SEVENTH: Religion consists of those actions, purposes, and experiences which are humanly significant. Nothing human is alien to the religious. It includes labor, art, science, philosophy, love, friendship, recreation--all that is in its degree expressive of intelligently satisfying human living. The distinction between the sacred and the secular can no longer be maintained.

EIGHTH: Religious Humanism considers the complete realization of human personality to be the end of man's life and seeks its development and fulfillment in the here and now. This is the explanation of the humanist's social passion.

NINTH: In the place of the old attitudes involved in worship and prayer the humanist finds his religious emotions expressed in a heightened sense of personal life and in a cooperative effort to promote social well-being.

TENTH: It follows that there will be no uniquely religious emotions and attitudes of the kind hitherto associated with belief in the supernatural.

ELEVENTH: Man will learn to face the crises of life in terms of his knowledge of their naturalness and probability. Reasonable and manly attitudes will be fostered by education and supported by custom. We assume that humanism will take the path of social and mental hygiene and discourage sentimental and unreal hopes and wishful thinking.

TWELFTH: Believing that religion must work increasingly for joy in living, religious humanists aim to foster the creative in man and to encourage achievements that add to the satisfactions of life.

THIRTEENTH: Religious humanism maintains that all associations and institutions exist for the fulfillment of human life. The intelligent evaluation, transformation, control, and direction of such associations and institutions with a view to the enhancement of human life is the purpose and program of humanism. Certainly religious institutions, their ritualistic forms, ecclesiastical methods, and communal activities must be reconstituted as rapidly as experience allows, in order to function effectively in the modern world.

FOURTEENTH: The humanists are firmly convinced that existing acquisitive and profit-motivated society has shown itself to be inadequate and that a radical change in methods, controls, and motives must be instituted. A socialized and cooperative economic order must be established to the end that the equitable distribution of the means of life be possible. The goal of humanism is a free and universal society in which people voluntarily and intelligently cooperate for the common good. Humanists demand a shared life in a shared world.

FIFTEENTH AND LAST: We assert that humanism will: (a) affirm life rather than deny it; (b) seek to elicit the possibilities of life, not flee from them; and (c) endeavor to establish the conditions of a satisfactory life for all, not merely for the few. By this positive morale and intention humanism will be guided, and from this perspective and alignment the techniques and efforts of humanism will flow.

So stand the theses of religious humanism. Though we consider the religious forms and ideas of our fathers no longer adequate, the quest for the good life is still the central task for mankind. Man is at last becoming aware that he alone is responsible for the realization of the world of his dreams, that he has within himself the power for its achievement. He must set intelligence and will to the task.

List of signers 

Of the 65 people who were asked to sign, 34 accepted. About half (15) were Unitarians. The 34 were:

J. A. C. Fagginger Auer (Parkman Professor of Church History and Theology, Harvard University; Professor of church history, Tufts College.)
E. Burdette Backus (minister, First Unitarian Church of Los Angeles)
Harry Elmer Barnes (general editorial department, Scripps-Howard Newspapers.)
L. M. Birkhead (the Liberal Center, Kansas City, Missouri.)
Raymond B. Bragg (secretary, Western Unitarian Conference.)
Edwin Arthur Burtt (professor of philosophy, Sage School of Philosophy, Cornell University.)
Ernest Caldecott (minister, First Unitarian Church of Los Angeles, California.)
A. J. Carlson (professor of physiology, University of Chicago.)
John Dewey (Columbia University.)
Albert C. Dieffenbach (former editor of the Christian Register.)
John H. Dietrich (minister, First Unitarian Society, Minneapolis.)
Bernard Fantus (professor of therapeutics, College of Medicine, University of Illinois.)
William Floyd (editor of the Arbitrator, New York City.)
F.H. Hankins (professor of economics and sociology, Smith College.)
A. Eustace Haydon (professor of history of religions, University of Chicago.)
Llewellyn Jones (literary critic and author.)
Robert Morss Lovett (editor, The New Republic; professor of English, University of Chicago.)
Harold P. Marley (minister, the Fellowship of Liberal Religion, Ann Arbor, Michigan.)
R. Lester Mondale (minister, Unitarian Church, Evanston, Illinois.)
Charles Francis Potter (leader and founder, the First Humanist Society of New York, Inc.)
John Herman Randall, Jr. (department of philosophy, Columbia University.)
Curtis W. Reese (dean, Abraham Lincoln Center, Chicago.)
Oliver L. Reiser (associate professor of philosophy, University of Pittsburgh.)
Roy Wood Sellars (professor of philosophy, University of Michigan.)
Clinton Lee Scott (minister, Universalist Church, Peoria, Illinois.)
Maynard Shipley (president, the Science League of America.)
W. Frank Swift (director, Boston Ethical Society.)
V. T. Thayer (educational director, Ethical Culture Schools.)
Eldred C. Vanderlaan (leader of the Free Fellowship, Berkeley, California.)
Joseph Walker (attorney, Boston, Massachusetts.)
Jacob J. Weinstein (rabbi; advisor to Jewish Students, Columbia University.)
Frank S. C. Wicks (All Souls Unitarian Church, Indianapolis.)
David Rhys Williams (minister, Unitarian Church, Rochester, New York.)
Edwin H. Wilson (managing editor, the New Humanist, Chicago, Illinois; minister, Third Unitarian Church, Chicago, Illinois.)

A 35th signature, that of Alson Robinson, came in too late for it to be published with the other 34.

References

External links 

 Humanist Manifesto I
 The Genesis of a Humanist Manifesto by Edwin H. Wilson

Humanist manifestos
Nontheism publications
Works originally published in New Humanist
1933 documents